Skyports Drone Services is a British provider and operator of eVTOL drones for cargo delivery, survey and monitoring. The company became famous for using drones to carry Covid-19 samples and test kits in some parts of Argyll and Bute which has been described as a UK first. It also received UK Government funding for establishing service and training facility at Argyll and Bute Council-owned Oban Airport.

The company is founded in 2018 by Duncan Walker & Simon Morrish. It is headquartered in London with additional offices located in Singapore, Dubai, Columbia and Japan.

In 2020 the Skyports drones was authorised by the UK government to carry Covid-19 kits from Mull, Clachan-Seil and Lochgilphead to Lorn and Islands Hospital in Oban. It was jointly funded by the UK Space Agency and the European Space Agency.

The Royal Mail partnered with it to launch a postal service using drones in Scotland. In 2023, they announced a Hub Operator Program for participants in Colombia, UAE, the UK, Kenya, and Korea.

Operations 
 Scotland
 Ireland
 United States
 Singapore

Certificates 
The Irish Aviation Authority (IAA) have issued the light UAS (Unmanned Aircraft Systems) operator certificate (LUC) to Skyports Drone Services and recognised across all 31 EASA member countries. It received Part 107 Waiver to fly UAS BVLOS and Part 375 Foreign Aircraft Permit in the USA.

In Singapore, it has received Class 1 Activity Permit for UAS Operations and UA Operator Permit (UOP) to fly BVLOS from the Civil Aviation Authority of Singapore.

References

2018 establishments in the United Kingdom
Unmanned aerial vehicle manufacturers of the United Kingdom
Companies based in London
British companies established in 2018
Multinational companies headquartered in the United Kingdom
Privately held companies based in London
Privately held companies of the United Kingdom